Snyagovo may refer to the following places in Bulgaria:

Snyagovo, Burgas Province
Snyagovo, Dobrich Province